A hydraulic compressor is a type of compressor that is designed to convert hydraulic power to pneumatic power. It is used across various industries to improve the efficiency of certain types of machinery. Hydraulic compressors have a hydraulic pump to push air through a pipe, which forces a motor to spin. The motor powers the internal air compressor, releasing air in a chamber as a result. Compressors became more popularized in 1799 when Englishman George Medhurst invented a motorized air compressor as a means for propulsion. They have technologically advanced to the point where they can achieve greater force and precision than humans.

Uses 
Because of the relatively cheap and easy installment of hydraulic compressors, many industries have implemented them into their equipment to effectively work and provide better results. This includes agriculture, automotive, medical, and industrial companies that require engineers or workers to have more output and innovation.

Agriculture 
Agricultural engineers can use it to expedite the process of growing plants or raising livestock. Farmers need the proper equipment to sustainably grow products to match consumer demands. Examples of this can be the milking machines used on cows or installing compressors to drones to shoot seeds and fertilizer into farmland. Many farming tools such as tractors or seeders have considerably boosted crop yields in the agriculture industry.

Automotive 
The vehicles used in everyday life all use hydraulic compressors for power or other functions. The thermodynamic process when turning on air conditioning in the car works by a compressor compressing air and hiking up the temperature of the refrigerant, which circulates cool air in the vehicle. Inflating tires or spraying paint are other notable things compressors can do. In South Korea, the use of compressors is necessary to obtain gases as energy supplies and is the main component for the development of hydrogen charging stations.

Medical 
Hydraulic compressors can also be adapted into medical equipment to save lives. During the COVID-19 pandemic, there was a sudden surge in demand for respirators, which were all powered by compressors to supply clean air to patients. They can also power hand-held devices that perform puncturing, drilling, and many other surgical operations that doctors may need to perform on patients.

Industrial 
A wide variety of pneumatic tools are used to build essential infrastructure that can range from government buildings to bridges and roads. Many engineers integrate hydraulic compressors into these tools because of the relatively affordable installation price and added efficiency. Some examples of these tools are:

 Wrenches
 Jackhammers
 Grinders
 Pounders
 Chainsaws
 Drills

Design

Features 
The feature of the hydraulic compressor is the ability to perform isothermal compression without any moving parts, making it more reliable and having low maintenance costs. A hydraulic pump is used to push air through a vertical pipe, called the downcomer pipe. Air is sucked into the water flow by the static pressure differential. As the air goes down the pipe, the pressure rises, producing air compression. The stilling chamber is designed to obtain low flow velocity, thus allowing the air bubbles to separate from the water. The compressed air leaves the chamber through another vertical pipe, called the raiser pipe.

Problems 
The main issue with these compressors is the development of the scale and dimensions of the chamber (compressed air storage). The price of the chamber can be more costly than the installation itself, depending on the size. Despite the relatively high cost of energy, the hydraulic compressor uses significantly less electricity and increases the production of renewable energy resources.

Cost Breakdown 

Fig 2: 0: Energy Cost, 1: Compressor Cost, 2: Maintenance Cost (Based on 24/7 operation, $0.08/kWh, full load operation).

Most of the expenses from integrating a compressor is the energy cost, as depicted in figure 2. The main factors are the type and size of the compressor. That is what determines the utility and power draw of the machine. To be most efficient, the air production capacity should match the air requirements to avoid bottlenecks and unnecessary energy being lost in the form of heat when the air is released. By optimizing utilization or preventing leakage, companies can increase their profit margins.               

The design of the piping can also affect the cost of the system. A pipe structure without sharp corners or dead-heads can help maintain pressure and an efficient passage for compressed air. Designers have to think about the type of material that will be used in the hydraulic system. Aluminum, for example, has a lower weight and corrosion resistance than the more traditional material, steel. Because it is much lighter than steel, aluminum pipes allow welders and technicians to manufacture and install them easier. The diameter of the pipe is also crucial since smaller diameters tend to have more pressure differential. That would cause more pressure energy to be converted to heat or vibration, thereby decreasing the compressor's lifespan

Efficiency 
To calculate the compressed airflow power, the equation  can be used to measure the maximum efficiency of a hydraulic compressor. However, in a real-world scenario, airflow loss needs to be accounted for. This can be done by applying the energy conservation equation for an isothermal flow (assuming water and air have the same pressure and velocity): . Many other factors can also cause the loss of air, such as collision against walls or the friction between water and air bubbles.  

The flow of compressed air produced increases when the mass flow rate of liquid circulating the system also increases. This flow can be calculated only at specific parts of the hydraulic pump, as various configurations can be implemented. Examples of these configurations include a parallel or series pumping arrangement. The pump curve can be defined using a derivation of the quadratic equation: . The equation calculates the efficiency of the pump head or driver, which can be graphed with electrical power consumed to compare hydraulic systems.

See also 

 Compressor

References 

Gas compressors
Pumps
Gas technologies